St Luke's Church, Kinoulton is a Grade II* listed parish church in the Church of England in Kinoulton.

History
The church dates from 1793 and was built in the Classical style for Henry Noel, 6th Earl of Gainsborough.

It replaced a church dedicated to St Wilfred which was located to the north of Kinoulton Lane. Although the building was demolished, the churchyard remains and contains a group of 34 headstones dating from the 1700s.

It is in a joint parish with two other churches of the same dedication:
St Luke's Church, Broughton Sulney
St Luke's Church, Hickling

Organ
The church has a one manual pipe organ fitted with an automatic barrel mechanism. It was installed in the church in 1947 by Cedric Arnold. A specification of the organ can be found on the National Pipe Organ Register.

References

Kinoulton
Grade II* listed churches in Nottinghamshire
Churches completed in 1793
1793 establishments in England